Prairie Fires: The American Dreams of Laura Ingalls Wilder is a 2017 biography of Little House on the Prairie  author Laura Ingalls Wilder, by Caroline Fraser. It was awarded the 2018 Pulitzer Prize for Biography or Autobiography, the National Book Critics Circle Award for Biography, and the Chicago Tribune Heartland Prize.

References

2017 non-fiction books
English-language books
Laura Ingalls Wilder
Pulitzer Prize for Biography or Autobiography-winning works
Metropolitan Books books
National Book Critics Circle Award-winning works